Ibrahim Saeed (Arabic:إبراهيم سعيد) (born 14 January 1992) is an Emirati footballer who plays for Dibba Al Fujairah as a left back.

External links

References

Emirati footballers
1992 births
Living people
Baniyas Club players
Al Dhafra FC players
Khor Fakkan Sports Club players
Dibba FC players
UAE Pro League players
Association football fullbacks